The Nive is a French river that flows through the French Basque Country. It is a left tributary of the river Adour. The river's source in the Pyrenees in Lower Navarre. The river Nive was made famous by the Le petit Nicolas series.

Geography 

The Nive proper is formed from three head rivers in Saint-Jean-Pied-de-Port:
 The Nive de Béhérobie (main stream)
 The Laurhibar
 The Nive d'Arnéguy.

The Nive passes through the towns of Estérençuby (Nive de Béhérobie), Saint-Jean-Pied-de-Port, Bidarray, Cambo-les-Bains, Ustaritz, Villefranque and Bayonne, where it flows into the Adour.

Principal tributaries 
 Ezterrengibel or Esterenguibel
 Nive des Aldudes, from Saint-Étienne-de-Baïgorry
 Laka, from Ossès
 Baztan, from Bidarray
 Latsa, from Espelette

See also 
 Battle of the Nive

References

External links 

  Au fil des Nives
  Tour de la Haute vallée de la Nive
  Contrat de Rivière des Nives

Rivers of France
Rivers of Nouvelle-Aquitaine
Rivers of Pyrénées-Atlantiques